Muhammed Abul Manzur  (24 February 1940 – 1 June 1981) was a Bangladeshi military officer who commanded the Bangladesh Forces operations in Sector 8 during the Bangladesh Liberation War against Pakistan in 1971. He was allegedly involved in the assassination of the then-President of Bangladesh, Ziaur Rahman. The erstwhile Chief of Army Staff and alleged mastermind of Rahman's assassination, Hussein Muhammad Ershad, had put a standing shoot-to-kill order on Manzur's life—he was killed shortly after being captured at the border. About a year later, Ershad initiated a bloodless coup d'état and took over the Central Government, holding power until 1990.

Manzur had been awarded the Bir Uttam by the Bangladeshi government for his actions in the Bangladesh Liberation War. At the time of his death, he was the general officer commanding (GOC) of the 24th Infantry Division headquartered at Chittagong. His surviving wife and four children were given political asylum in the United States.

Early life 
Manzur was born on 24 January 1940 into a Bengali Muslim family in the village of Gupinathpur in the Bengal Presidency of British India (now in Brahmanbaria District, Bangladesh). His ancestral paternal home was in the village of Kamalpur in Chatkhil, Noakhali.

He was a student in Calcutta before enrolling at the Armanitola Government High School in Dacca at class five. He moved to attend school in PAF College Sargodha in first entry (54,	Tempest), Punjab, West Pakistan, and passed the Senior Cambridge and ISc examinations in 1955 and 1956, respectively. Manzur earned an intermediate degree from the Sargodha Air Force Cadet College and studied at Dacca University in East Pakistan for a year. Following his graduation, Manzur joined the Pakistani Army, subsequently attending the Pakistan Military Academy and the Defence Services Staff College in Canada, where he obtained his PSC in 1958 and joined the East Bengal Regiment of the Pakistan Army as a commissioned officer.

After the Liberation War started, Major Manzoor was a brigade major of a Para Commando Brigade close to the Indian border. He escaped from West Pakistan to India with Major Abu Taher, Major Mohammad Ziauddin, and Captain Bazlul Ghani Patwari and with his family. 
. From there, they made their way to Bangladesh, and Manzoor joined up with fellow officers from East Bengal. He quickly became a prominent officer within the ranks and won many battles in his sector. He commanded Sector – VIII during the Liberation War from September 1971 to victory in December 1971.

In 1974–76, he was posted in New Delhi as Military Attache in the High Commission of Bangladesh to India. Known for his tenacity, keen eye for strategy, and formation of loyalty from colleagues, in 1975 he was promoted to colonel.

Upon his return to Dhaka in 1977, he was promoted to Brigadier. In 1980, he was promoted to major general at the age of 41. He was one of the youngest generals of a front-line force in south-east Asia's history.

Role in assassination of Ziaur Rahman 

General Hussain Muhammad Ershad, Chief of Army Staff, transferred Major-General Manzoor to a non-combatant post in Dhaka as Commandant of the Defence Services Command and Staff College. Manzoor was the General Officer Commanding (GOC) of Chittagong, and freedom fighters placed under his command were given the highest posts. Once the transfer order was sent to Manzoor, he launched a coup on the morning of 30 May, and ordered the killing of President Ziaur Rahman at Chittagong Circuit House. That Sunday, 30 May, Manzoor broadcast on Bangladesh Radio from Chittagong station, saying, "Let us have a united stand to run the country and make it a real nation of the people." In the face of an ultimatum for surrender by the government, most of Manzoor's troops had abandoned their posts or had joined the government, which ended the rebellion. Later, government soldiers retook the radio station, and Bangladesh Radio announced a 500,000 taka reward for capture -dead or alive- of Manzoor.

Although the assassination of President Ziaur Rahman was carried out in Chittagong on 30 May 1981, the military coup d'état failed. Major-General Manzoor went on radio to speak to the nation. According to the historian Anthony Mascarenhas in his Bangladesh: A Legacy of Blood, Manzoor effectively isolated Chittagong from the rest of the country. Chief of Army Staff, Lieutenant General Hussain Muhammad Ershad, quickly ordered to suppress any such action and issued orders to kill or capture Manzoor. Manzoor surrendered without incident to the police in Fatikchari. Manzoor was reported to have been killed on spot by angry soldiers on 2 June 1981. Other reports say he was killed in Chittagong Cantonment by an army officer sent from Dhaka. In less than a year, Lt-General Hussain Muhammad Ershad took over the country in a bloodless coup.

Trial

On 28 February 1995, Abul Mansur the elder brother of General Manzoor filed a murder case with Panchlaish Police Station 14 years after his killing. Jatiya Party Chairman HM Ershad was made the prime accused in the case. Other accused are Maj (retired) Kazi Emdadul Haque, Lt Col (retired) Mostafa Kamaluddin Bhuiyan, Lieutenant Colonel (retired) Shams, and Major General (retired) Abdul Latif.

Family and legacy 

He left behind his wife Rana Yasmeen Manzur and 2 daughters & 2 sons.  They received political asylum in the US. He was considered a war hero as Sector 8 Commander in the Liberation War.

Notes

References

Further reading

 Ali, Tariq. Pakistan: Military Rule or People's Power?, London: Cape, 1970.

1940 births
1981 deaths
Coup d'état attempts in Asia
Bangladeshi murder victims
Conflicts in 1981
Generals of the Bangladesh Liberation War
Bangladesh Army generals
Mukti Bahini personnel
PAF College Sargodha alumni
Recipients of the Bir Uttom
People from Chatkhil Upazila
20th-century Bengalis
People from Kasba Upazila